Switch Off is a short film directed by Anoop Gangadharan. It is the first short film which features only gadgets and was selected for Limca Book of Records.

References

Indian short films
2013 short films
2013 films